Amalia Dutra, Ph.D (b. 1958), is a Uruguayan-American genetic biologist known for being part of the team that mapped the human genome.

Biography
In 1988, she emigrated to the United States of America and found work at the University of Pennsylvania in Philadelphia, researching the genetics of immune disorders at the Children's Hospital of Philadelphia. In 1993, she began researching at the National Human Genome Research Institute (NHGRI) in Washington.

Currently, she is the Director of the Central Laboratory of Cytogenetics and Confocal Microscopy (Cytogenetic and Confocal Microscopy Core) of NHGRI.

Citations

1958 births
Uruguayan geneticists
Uruguayan women scientists
University of the Republic (Uruguay) alumni
Living people